Nirmala College is a first grade arts and science college in Muvattupuzha, Kerala, India run by the Syro-Malabar Catholic Church. The college admits undergraduates and post-graduates and offers degrees in the liberal arts, sciences and commerce. The college celebrated the golden jubilee in the academic year 2002–2003. The institution is affiliated to the Mahatma Gandhi University, Kottayam. The college was Re accredited by NAAC With A++ (CGPA:3.73)Grade in April 2021.Nirmala College is governed by a management board consisting of 47 members. The Board meets at least four times a year and takes  all important decisions concerning the governance of the college.

History

The college is run by the Syro-Malabar Catholic Diocese of Kothamangalam. It is situated in Avoly Panchayat of Muvattupuzha Taluk in the district of Ernakulam. The college is located on the Punalur-Muvattupuzha State Highway (SH-08), just  2 km drive from Muvattupuzha town. It was founded in 1953  to meet the educational needs of the Eastern parts of North Travancore, especially of the Syrian Catholic Community, at a time, when higher education was the wildest dream of the ordinary people living in the villages and the suburbs. Msgr. Thomas Nedumkallel was the founding principal and chief architect of Nirmala College, Muvattupuzha. In 1955, the college was raised to First Grade by starting B.A., B.Sc. and B.Com. courses. Post-graduate courses were introduced in 1965 and research facilities are now available in many departments.

Thus over the years, the college has grown in size and stature. It offers 15 bachelor's degree courses, 11 master's degree courses and has five research centers (Chemistry, Commerce, Malayalam, Hindi and Statistics). Now Nirmala is one of the foremost colleges in Kerala with 2071 students and 123 faculty members. The college is affiliated with Mahatma Gandhi University, Kottayam and is nationally accredited by National Assessment and Accreditation Council With  A++ grade and with a CGPA of 3.73 in 2021.

Other facilities 
Auditorium
Garden
Football & Cricket ground
Movie Theatre
AV Recording Studio
AV Edit Suite
 Amenities centre
 Chapel
 Canteen
 Central Computing Facility
 Placement Cell
 ATM-South Indian Bank
 Central Library

Academics
The college offers courses at undergraduate and postgraduate levels. The Arts/Humanities stream includes English, Economics, History, Malayalam and Sociology. Science courses include Physics, Chemistry, Botany, Zoology and Computer Science. Commerce is also a stream at Nirmala College.

The college is located on a Hill (50 acre) campus in the heart of the Muvattupuzha. Its tree-lined pathways, academic buildings, steepled Gothic chapel and playgrounds make for a Landmark.

Courses
A list of  undergraduate and post graduate courses are offered in this college are given below.

Undergraduate

Postgraduate

Notable alumni

K. Balakrishnan Nair, Judge
M. P. Narayana Pillai, Cartoonist 
Vaisakhan, short story writer 
Johnny Nellore, politician 
Jeethu Joseph, film director
Dr. George Onakkoor, writer
 Raju Nair, Journalist
Swasika, actress, model
Eldhose Kunnappilly, former member of kerala legislative assembly

Alumni
The Nirmala Alumni Association is one of the important supportive organisations in Nirmala college, aim of which is to renew contacts and strengthen cordial relations and to keep alive the noble standards of Nirmala's culture and traditions. The association gives opportunities to exchange our views at appropriate intervals. It conducts various programmes for the welfare of the students, organizes meetings to highlight issues of national and contemporary relevance and collaborates with the college for reaching out programmes.

MCA
Department of Computer Science is a self-financing wing of Nirmala College. The MCA programme is of two years duration with two semesters for each year. This program with a batch strength of 60 students is approved by All India Council for Technical Education and is affiliated to M.G University, Kottayam. This course is intended to train graduates in the development and use of software for different applications. The major thrust is on giving the students a sound background in computing on business functions and mathematics relevant to computer software development.

References

External links
Nirmala College official website
Nirmala College official FB Page

Universities and colleges in Ernakulam district
Colleges affiliated to Mahatma Gandhi University, Kerala
Catholic universities and colleges in India
Archdiocese of Ernakulam-Angamaly
Muvattupuzha
1953 establishments in India
Educational institutions established in 1953